Perpendicular is the relationship between two lines which meet at a right angle.

Perpendicular may also refer to:

 Perpendicular axis theorem
 Perpendicular Gothic architecture style of mediaeval Gothic architecture in the Kingdom of England
 Perpendicular plate of ethmoid bone
 Perpendicular plate of palatine bone
 Perpendicular Point, New Zealand
 Perpendicular recording, disc drive technology

See also
 Point Perpendicular, New South Wales, Australia
 Purpendicular, music album by Deep Purple